
In economics, a consumer's indirect utility function
 gives the consumer's maximal attainable utility when faced with a vector  of goods prices and an amount of income .  It reflects both the consumer's preferences and market conditions.

This function is called indirect because consumers usually think about their preferences in terms of what they consume rather than prices.  A consumer's indirect utility  can be computed from his or her utility function  defined over vectors  of quantities of consumable goods, by first computing the most preferred affordable bundle, represented by the vector  by solving the utility maximization problem, and second, computing the utility  the consumer derives from that bundle. The resulting indirect utility function is

The indirect utility function is:

Continuous on Rn+ × R+ where n is the number of goods;
Decreasing in prices;
Strictly increasing in income;
Homogenous with degree zero in prices and income; if prices and income are all multiplied by a given constant the same bundle of consumption represents a maximum, so optimal utility does not change;
 quasi-convex in (p,w).

Indirect utility and expenditure 
The indirect utility function is the inverse of the expenditure function when the prices are kept constant. I.e, for every price vector  and utility level :

Example

Let's say the utility function is the Cobb-Douglas function  which has the Marshallian demand functions   

where  is the consumer's income. The indirect utility function  is found by replacing the quantities in the utility function with the demand functions thus: 

 

where  Note that the utility function shows the utility for whatever quantities its arguments hold, even if they are not optimal for the consumer and do not solve his utility maximization problem. The indirect utility function, in contrast, assumes that the consumer has derived his demand functions optimally for given prices and income.

See also 
 Gorman polar form
 Hicksian demand function
 Value function

References

Further reading

Utility function types